Gianluca Basile (born 24 January 1975) is an Italian former professional basketball player. At a height of 1.92 m (6'3 ") tall and a weight of 95 kg (210 lbs.), he mainly played at the shooting guard position. He is considered one of the best 1990s and 2000s era Italian basketball players. He won the silver medal at the 2004 Summer Olympic Games, and the gold medal at the 1999 EuroBasket. He was also the captain of the men's Italy national team.

Professional career
Basile played four years with Italian club Pallacanestro Reggiana, and seven years with Fortitudo Bologna, with whom he won two LBA championships, as the team's captain. In 2005, he moved to Spanish club FC Barcelona. In July 2011, he signed a two-year deal with Italian club Pallacanestro Cantù.

On 6 July 2012 Italian club Emporio Armani Milano, officially announced the signing of Basile, to a one-year contract. His contract with the team expired on 30 June 2013 and he became a free agent.

He finished his career with Italian club Orlandina Basket, and last played in the 2015–16 season.

National team career
Basile was the leader of the men's Italy national basketball team that won the silver medal at the 2004 Summer Olympics in Athens, which was the best result for Italy since they took the silver medal at the 1980 Summer Olympics. He also helped Italy beat Team USA, by a score of 95-78, by scoring 25 points in a pre-Olympic friendly game against the US in 2004. His medals with the Italy national team also include a gold medal at the EuroBasket 1999, a bronze medal at the EuroBasket 2003, and a silver medal at the 1997 Mediterranean Games.

Player profile
Basile excelled in the role of shooting guard, or point forward, and was a very effective three-point shooter. He invented and named the "tiro ignorante" ("ignorant shot"), a three-point shot taken under difficult conditions, and which would surprise his opponents.

EuroLeague career statistics

|-
| style="text-align:left;"| 2000–01
| style="text-align:left;"| Bologna
| 18 || 14 || 27.3 || .417 || .311 || .729 || 3.1 || 2.2 || 1.5 || .2 || 9.9 || 9.5
|-
| style="text-align:left;"| 2001–02
| style="text-align:left;"| Bologna
| 17 || 14 || 32.3 || .442 || .430 || .732 || 2.2 || 3.2 || 1.6 || .4 || 11.8 || 12.4
|-
| style="text-align:left;"| 2002–03
| style="text-align:left;"| Bologna
| 19 || 17 || 33.6 || .404 || .359 || .860 || 3.1 || 3.4 || 1.7 || .2 || 13.8 || 11.7
|-
| style="text-align:left;"| 2003–04
| style="text-align:left;"| Bologna
| 17 || 12 || 29.3 || .396 || .387 || .833 || 2.6 || 2.9 || 1.3 || .0 || 12.1 || 11.5
|-
| style="text-align:left;"| 2004–05
| style="text-align:left;"| Bologna
| 20 || 18 || 30.4 || .401 || .358 || .902 || 3.8 || 2.9 || 2.0 || .1 || 12.6 || 12.6
|-
| style="text-align:left;"| 2005–06
| style="text-align:left;"| Barcelona
| 23 || 6 || 23.5 || .364 || .294 || .814 || 2.2 || 1.6 || 1.0 || .2 || 8.7 || 7.9
|-
| style="text-align:left;"| 2006–07
| style="text-align:left;"| Barcelona
| 22 || 12 || 26.6 || .465 || .440 || .741 || 2.5 || 1.6 || 1.1 || .1 || 9.6 || 8.5
|-
| style="text-align:left;"| 2007–08
| style="text-align:left;"| Barcelona
| 22 || 18 || 26.1 || .379 || .283 || .771 || 2.9 || 1.5 || 1.3 || .0 || 9.9 || 8.3
|-
| style="text-align:left;"| 2008–09
| style="text-align:left;"| Barcelona
| 23 || 13 || 23.3 || .500 || .506 || .889 || 2.1 || 1.7 || 1.2 || .0 || 7.8 || 8.6
|-
| style="text-align:left;background:#AFE6BA;"| 2009–10†
| style="text-align:left;"| Barcelona
| 18 || 0 || 17.3 || .289 || .294 || .750 || 1.9 || .8 || .4 || .0 || 4.1 || 2.1
|-
| style="text-align:left;"| 2011–12
| style="text-align:left;"| Cantù
| 15 || 5 || 21.9 || .422 || .430 || .833 || 1.9 || 3.1 || .1 || .0 || 10.0 || 9.5
|-
| style="text-align:left;"| 2012–13
| style="text-align:left;"| Milano
| 9 || 0 || 11.7 || .409 || .316 || 1.000 || .6 || .7 || .2 || .0 || 3.3 || 1.6
|- class="sortbottom"
| style="text-align:left;"| Career
| style="text-align:left;"|
| 223 || 129 || 25.9 || .408 || .366 || .811 || 2.5 || 2.1 || 1.2 || .1 || 9.7 || 8.9

Honors and awards

Fortitudo Bologna 
2× Italian League Champion: (2000, 2005)

FC Barcelona 
2× Spanish League Champion: (2008–09, 2010–11)
3× Spanish Cup Winner: (2007, 2010, 2011)
2× Spanish Super Cup Winner: (2009, 2010)
EuroLeague Champion: (2009–10)

Italy national team 
1997 Mediterranean Games: 
1999 EuroBasket: 
2003 EuroBasket: 
2004 Summer Olympic Games:

Individual 
Italian League MVP: (2004)
Italian League Finals MVP: (2005)
Officer of the Order of Merit of the Italian Republic - Rome, 27 September 2004. The initiative of the President of the Republic.

References

External links

 FIBA Archive Profile
 FIBA Europe Profile
 Euroleague.net Profile
 Eurobasket.com Profile
 Italian League Profile 
 Spanish League Profile 

1975 births
Living people
1998 FIBA World Championship players
2006 FIBA World Championship players
Basketball players at the 2000 Summer Olympics
Basketball players at the 2004 Summer Olympics
Competitors at the 1997 Mediterranean Games
FC Barcelona Bàsquet players
FIBA EuroBasket-winning players
Fortitudo Pallacanestro Bologna players
Italian expatriate basketball people in Spain
Italian men's basketball players
Lega Basket Serie A players
Liga ACB players
Medalists at the 2004 Summer Olympics
Mediterranean Games medalists in basketball
Mediterranean Games silver medalists for Italy
Olympic basketball players of Italy
Olympic medalists in basketball
Olympic silver medalists for Italy
Orlandina Basket players
Pallacanestro Cantù players
Olimpia Milano players
Pallacanestro Reggiana players
People from Ruvo di Puglia
Point guards
Shooting guards
Small forwards
Sportspeople from the Metropolitan City of Bari